hit104.7 (call sign: 2ROC) is a commercial FM radio station broadcasting in Canberra, Australian Capital Territory, Australia, on a frequency of 104.7 MHz, and is part of Southern Cross Austereo's Hit Network.

hit104.7 and sister station MIX 106.3 broadcast from Crace in the Australian Capital Territory.

History

In 1987, Canberra radio station 2CA was awarded the licence to operate a supplementary FM service.  The station was assigned the call-sign 2ROC and on-air branding FM104 (later changed to FM104.7). It commenced broadcasting on 27 February 1988 on the frequency 104.7 MHz FM.  FM104, along with rival KIX106, were the first new commercial FM radio stations to be licensed in Australia in eight years and were the first supplementary FM licences in Australia.

In 1988, 2CA and 2ROC were sold to Austereo.

In the mid-1990s, due to AM radio's dwindling audience and the increasing popularity of the music based FM stations Austereo - owner of 104.7 & 2CA and ARN - owner of Mix 106.3 & 2CC, merged to form a joint venture ownership of both FM stations - Canberra FM Pty Ltd. The AM stations were sold off and moved to other premises.

In December 2015, Southern Cross Austereo and Australian Radio Network announced that FM104.7 will rebrand to hit104.7.

On Monday 18 January 2016 hit104.7 launched with a new breakfast show, Ryan & Tanya, as the station joined the Hit Network. As well as a new name and branding it gives the station even greater access to the network's on-air, online and social content. Since 2018, the hit104.7 breakfast show has been hosted by Ned & Josh.

References

External links

Radio stations in Canberra
Radio stations established in 1988
Contemporary hit radio stations in Australia
Southern Cross Media Group
Australian Radio Network